The Power of Gloria Gaynor, also known as The Power, or The Power of Love, is the twelfth studio album by Gloria Gaynor, released in 1986, which is composed mostly of cover versions of other popular songs from the 1970s and 1980s, and is her only album to be released on Stylus Records. It was originally only released in the UK. The album was issued on record, compact disc and cassette, each containing bonus tracks of re-recorded versions of a few of Gaynor's biggest hits in a medley and a remixed version of "Don't You Dare Call It Love".

The Power of Gloria Gaynor was a huge departure from her disco albums, as well as her previous two albums that were R&B and dance based. It failed to perform any better than Gaynor's previous efforts of the 1980s, but did peak at #81 on the UK album chart in October 1986. It has been licensed by many low-budget record labels and re-released on CD countless times (never by the same name) occasionally with other tracks by Gloria Gaynor recorded for other albums. On many reissues of the album, a cover of "Careless Whisper" is also included, which was presumably recorded for this album in London with the rest of the tracks, but went unused when the album was originally released.

The only single released was the remixed version of "Don't You Dare Call It Love", one of two tracks written by Gaynor for this release, on a 12-inch single in the UK. The B-side contained Gaynor's cover of "Every Breath You Take", originally recorded by The Police in 1983, also remixed.

Track listing

References

External links
 The Power of Gloria Gaynor at Discogs

1986 albums
Gloria Gaynor albums
Soft rock albums by American artists